The bodybuilding events  at the 2009 World Games in Kaohsiung occurred between 18 and 19 July. 40 athletes from 17 nations participated in the tournament. The bodybuilding competition took place in Kaohsiung Cultural Center Jhihde Hall. The competition included both men's and women's events among seven different weight categories. It was conducted by the International Federation of BodyBuilding & Fitness.

Ukraine topped the standings with three gold medals. On 26 October 2009 the IWGA announced that four male medal-winners were disqualified for doping violations, and their medals were stripped.

Participating nations

Doping sanctions
On 26 October 2009 the IWGA announced sanctions against the following four competitors: 
 Beila Balog, Ukraine, middleweight gold medalist, who tested positive twice on various anabolic steroids, diuretics and SERMs – disqualification of results at the 2009 World Games, forfeiture of medals and permanent lifetime suspension from The World Games.
 Kamal Abdulsalam Abdulrahman, Qatar, heavyweight silver medalist, who tested positive on tamoxifen (SERMs) – disqualification of results at the 2009 World Games and forfeiture of medals.
 Luiz-Carlos Sarmento, Brazil, light heavyweight silver medalist, who tested positive on various anabolic steroids, tamoxifen, SERMs, testosterone – disqualification of results at the 2009 World Games, forfeiture of medals and permanent lifetime suspension from The World Games. 
 Oleksandr Bilous, Ukraine, heavyweight gold medalist, who tested positive on various masking agents/diuretics and testosterone – disqualification of results at the 2009 World Games, forfeiture of medals and permanent lifetime suspension from The World Games.

Medal table

Events

Men

Women

References

External links
 musclememory.com
 International Federation of Bodybuilding and Fitness
 Bodybuilding on IWGA website
 Results

 
2009 World Games
2009
2009 in bodybuilding
Bodybuilding competitions in Taiwan